Meet Me in St. Louis were a post-hardcore band from Guildford, Surrey, formed in 2005 and disbanded in 2008.

History
Meet Me in St. Louis first formed in 2005. They were signed to Function Records & BSM Records in England and Denovali Records in Germany, the band's name originates from the 1944 film of the same name. In 2005 they recorded a three-track demo, Promise me that we'll never be like them. I don't want to wind up like that. Relax, baby. We're going to end up like us. The next year they made their first official release, a five-track EP on Function Records called And With the Right Kind of Eyes You Can Almost See the High Water Mark That Place Where the Wave Finally Broke and Rolled Back.

After a split release with fellow labelmates Secondsmile and contributions to several compilations, the band released their much-hyped first LP Variations on Swing received a nationwide release on 24 September 2007 on Big Scary Monsters Records.

The band have been featured on and supported by several important British publications such as Drowned in Sound, Kerrang, Rock Sound and NME.

In January 2008 the band said they were planning a break after 3 years continual touring. But on 6 February 2008, the band confirmed that they were no more. This comes after claims made by the band at their final show at the Queen Charlotte, Norwich the previous night (4 February 2008)

The first ever 'Meet Me in St Louis Day' – an unofficial bank holiday invented by the band's label, Big Scary Monsters Recording Company – took place on Wednesday 24 September 2008, with fans all over the world paying their respects. The date (which marked the anniversary of their debut's release) has since become an annual event with the math-rock fraternity paying their respects and helping the band's memory live on.

In January 2016, three shows were announced for Leeds and two in London in June after 8 years of silence. Further shows in Kingston upon Thames, Guildford and at ArcTanGent festival were announced, with the latter proving to be the final show of their reunion phase.

Toby's departure
On 30 October 2007 the band announced through its official website that vocalist Toby Hayes had decided to leave Meet Me in St. Louis but assured that the rest of the band would find a new vocalist and continue going on strong. Toby formed Shoes and Socks Off who released several albums with Big Scary Monsters, and was a founding member of Shield Your Eyes and Love Among The Mannequins. He now writes using the moniker Eugene Quell.

Other projects
Bassist Lewis Reynolds went on to play in the Kingston "math-pop" band Colour (who played their final show on 18 September 2009), whilst Toby Hayes began a solo project called Shoes and Socks Off (and played his final show on 24 September 2012). In early 2009 Oliver Knowles filled in for Daniel Neal, violinist of Yndi Halda on their American tour and featured on the Secondsmile album "Years".

It was announced as of 11 September 2009 that Reynolds and Knowles would join Paul Philips to play alongside former Bullet Union singer and guitar player Jodie Cox in their new band Tropics. Tropics changed their name to Exes in mid-2014 and released their debut album 'Phantasmaboring' on 28 July 2014.

Discography

Videography
Why Thank You, Suzie (2006)
All We Need Is A Little Energon, And A Lot of Luck (2007)

References

External links
MySpace
PureVolume
Big Scary Monsters Recording Company
Denovali Records
Function Records

British post-hardcore musical groups
Musical groups established in 2005
Musical groups disestablished in 2008
Musical groups reestablished in 2016
2005 establishments in England
2008 disestablishments in England
People from Guildford
Musical groups from Surrey